Dimitrios Delifotis (born 20 February 1957 in Corfu, Ionia) is a retired track and field athlete from Greece, who mainly competed in the men's long jump. He represented his native country at the 1980 Summer Olympics in Moscow, Soviet Union.

References

1957 births
Living people
Greek male long jumpers
Athletes (track and field) at the 1980 Summer Olympics
Olympic athletes of Greece
Mediterranean Games gold medalists for Greece
Athletes (track and field) at the 1983 Mediterranean Games
Mediterranean Games medalists in athletics
Sportspeople from Corfu